The Sarasota Thunder were a professional indoor football team based in Sarasota, Florida. They played in the Ultimate Indoor Football League (UIFL) for part of the 2013 season before folding. The Thunder initially announced Robarts Arena as their home venue, though they played all their games on the road.

Franchise history
In August 2012, the Sarasota Thunder was announced as the third 2013 expansion team of the Ultimate Indoor Football League. This was the second attempt to bring an indoor football team to Sarasota, the first being the Florida Scorpions of the National Indoor Football League. The team announced they would play their home games at Robarts Arena. In September 2012, the Thunder named Greg Walls the franchise's first head coach.

Before the season, however, the league took over control of the Thunder and shifted them to an all-travel schedule, with no home games in Sarasota. The team played very poorly, generally losing in blowouts. Their performance caused disruption through the league, as their host teams had difficulty drawing fans to such lopsided games. On May 9, the Florida Tarpons – whose owners also owned the UIFL – announced the Thunder had forfeited a scheduled game against them; the league subsequently folded the team.

Coaches of note

Head coaches

Coaching staff

Season-by-season results

References

External links
Sarasota Thunder official site

Former Ultimate Indoor Football League teams
American football teams in Florida
2012 establishments in Florida
2013 disestablishments in Florida
Sports in Sarasota County, Florida
American football teams established in 2012
American football teams disestablished in 2013